Joseph Shalom de Shalom Gallego (died 25 November 1624) was a Hebrew poet and ḥazzan.

Biography
Originally from Salonika, Gallego moved to Amsterdam around 1614, where he served for fourteen years as the first ḥazzan of the city's first synagogue, Beth Jacob. According to some sources, he later moved to the Land of Israel. 

He edited the collection Imre No'am, containing religious poems, hymns, and elegies (Amsterdam, 1628), many of which were set to melodies of Ladino folk songs. Several of his Hebrew poems are also to be found in the manuscript collection Kol tefillah ve-kol zimrah of David Franco Mendes. Gallego translated from Hebrew into Spanish the ethical writings of Jonah de Gerona, under the title Sendroe [Sendero] de Vidas (Amsterdam, n.d.; 2d ed., Amsterdam, 1640).

Publications

References
 

1624 deaths
17th-century Dutch poets
Clergy from Amsterdam
Dutch male poets
Dutch Sephardi Jews
Hazzans
Hebrew-language poets
Hebrew–Spanish translators
Jewish Dutch writers
Jews from Thessaloniki
Writers from Amsterdam
Writers from Thessaloniki